SS Sagaing was a twin-hatched passenger and cargo steamship that regularly plied a route connecting Liverpool, Glasgow and Rangoon in the first half of the 20th century. It was attacked and partially destroyed at Trincomalee Harbour by aircraft of the Imperial Japanese Navy in 1942, as part of the Easter Sunday Raid on Ceylon. The hulk was sunk a year later to act as a pier but was raised in 2018 after a 5-month operation by the Sri Lanka Navy, moved out of the harbour area, and resunk.

History
The Sagaing was built in the 1924–1925 period by William Denny and Brothers at their Leven shipyard (yard number 1167) in Dumbarton, Scotland, and completed on 13 March 1925. It was made to an order placed by P Henderson & Company through the British and Burmese Steam Navigation Company which they managed, registered at Glasgow, and placed in service on their Shaw, Savill & Albion Line. The Sagaing thus plied a route between Glasgow, Liverpool and Rangoon, although this could be subject to change. Other routes included ports of call such as Halifax, Hampton Roads and Saint Lucia.

On the night of 18 October 1939, the U-boat U-48 pursued the Sagaing and fired torpedoes at it during a patrol in the North Atlantic Ocean. She had been part of Convoy Blue3 sailing from Port Said to Gibraltar with the SS Nevasa, then joined Convoy HG3 alongside SS Garbrattan, City of Guildford and Clan Macbean to Liverpool. Passengers panicked and several got aboard a lifeboat and cast off, and were lost at sea.

The Sagaing was placed under the Ministry of War Transport at some point before April 1942, and was slated by the owners to be placed under the operational control of the Burma Steamship Company and sail under the Burmese flag in order to avoid Board of Trade safety regulations.

Attack at Trincomalee
The Sagaing undertook its last Rangoon–Glasgow run in 1941, reaching Glasgow on 19 December 1941 for repairs. This lasted until 7 February 1942, and she sailed for Rangoon three days later on 10 February with a crew/passenger complement of 123. On her departure from the United Kingdom, the crew received Top Secret orders from the Allied Chief of Staff, assigning to them a cargo of munitions. The cargo consisted of disassembled Hawker Hurricanes, assorted ammunition, mines and about 2300 depth charges, mostly stored above decks; this was in addition to a regular cargo of 20,000 cases each of Allsopp beer and Johnnie Walker Red Label whiskey. En route, the ship called at Cape Town on 12 March (sailing out on the 13th), Durban on 16 March (sailing on the 19th) and Colombo on 1 April (sailing on the 3rd); on their way to Ceylon, the crew had received multiple telegrams from the Admiralty that an attack by the Japanese was highly probable, given their naval presence in Southeast Asia following the fall of both Rangoon and Singapore. The approach to Trincomalee on 3 and 4 April was thus performed close to shore to avoid any patrolling Japanese aircraft or ships from a fleet patrolling the Straits of Malacca; the approach was made in poor visibility caused by heavy fog. The Sagaing reached Trincomalee early on the 4th, berthing at the munitions anchorage at Malay Cove and awaiting orders for the unloading of the war cargo. On 5 April, she attempted to sail out but returned to Trincomalee the following day.

A series of false alarms of a Japanese attack took place in the days that followed- the last such alarm was on the morning of 9 April. An all-clear signal had been given, but a short while later Japanese aircraft appeared with no warning, bombing the harbour. The Sagaing was struck both fore and aft in the first bombing run, incapacitating its captain. A second volley took place, at the end of which the ship was listing to starboard and inclining forward into the water, its engine room flooded and its doors jammed shut from hull deformation. A third volley blasted open the hatch doors to the holds below deck, exposing the volatile cargo of alcohol to shelling. Soon, the ship was on fire below decks and the crew began neutralizing the depth charges for dumping overboard and preparing lifeboats for launch, while the fire spread through hatchways across the decks and towards the crew quarters. The crew evacuated about fifteen minutes later, at which point the ship's plating was glowing red, and the ship appeared to briefly right itself before listing starboard even more heavily. Compressed air from below decks vented violently, tearing the deck plates apart and forming a cloud of mud and rust over the ship; shortly afterwards, the ship exploded as the fires reached the munitions that had not been dumped overboard, and slowly drifted towards the shore of Malay Cove. Most of the undamaged munitions and aircraft were rescued. The aircraft carrying out the attack were later established to be part of the Imperial Japanese Navy's Kidō Butai. The entire attack lasted less than half an hour.

On 24 August 1943, the hulk of the ship was shelled and sunk deliberately by order of the Government of Ceylon for use as a pier; the wreck lay  underwater.

Salvaging
On 11 September 2017, the Eastern Command of the Sri Lanka Navy was assigned the task of salvaging the wreck and moving it to a different location in order to make room for a harbour expansion project. Captain Krishantha Athukorala, Command Diving Officer of the Eastern Command, headed the operation, which was supervised by senior diver A Liyanage. Strengthening of the hulk's superstructure was carried out, and a prebuilt artificial side to the ship had to be installed in order to enable dewatering of the wreck below deck level in order to reestablish buoyancy. The operation took 5 months to complete, requiring a team of 98 divers deployed permanently, and assistance from a crane barge lent by the Tokyo Cement Company. The wreck was refloated on 22 March.

The refloated hulk was then moved out of the harbour's vicinity and resunk for preservation on 30 March 2018.

Design
She was assessed at 7,994 gross register tons with 4,678 net register tons of cargo space and a cargo capacity of 10,330 deadweight tons. She was powered by 3 Scotch boilers and a single 3 cylinder triple expansion steam engine producing a total of 471 nominal horsepower and a top speed of 13.5–14 knots; a low pressure turbine was added in 1939. Propulsion was achieved using a single shaft, single screw setup.

The ship had a two-hatch cargo hold with light-duty union-purchase derricks, and is described as follows in April 1942:

The installation of a Browning anti-aircraft gun on the poop deck had been planned but never enacted, and, by the time of the attack at Trincomalee, the ship had had all of its safety equipment and stock of emergency spare parts removed by the owning company.

References

External links
Discussion forum for the 1939 U-boat attack on the Sagaing
News report covering the salvage operation (Video)

1924 ships
Ships built on the River Clyde
Maritime incidents in April 1942
Ministry of War Transport ships
Passenger ships of the United Kingdom
Ships sunk by Japanese aircraft
Shipwrecks of Sri Lanka
Steamships
Steamships of the United Kingdom
World War II merchant ships of the United Kingdom
World War II shipwrecks in the Indian Ocean
Merchant ships sunk by aircraft